Interferon kappa, also known as IFN-kappa, is a protein that in humans is encoded by the IFNK gene.

Function 
IFN-kappa is a member of the type I interferon family. Type I interferons are a group of related glycoproteins that play an important role in host defenses against viral infections. This protein is expressed in keratinocytes and the gene is found on chromosome 9, adjacent to the type I interferon cluster.

References

3.Antiviral activity of transiently expressed IFN-kappa is cell-associated. Buontempo, P.J., Jubin, R.G., Buontempo, C.A., Wagner, N.E., Reyes, G.R., Baroudy, B.M. J. Interferon Cytokine Res. (2006) [Pubmed]

Further reading